Slavko Šlander is a district (Slovene mestna četrt) of the City Municipality of Celje and a neighborhood of the city of Celje in Slovenia. It was named after the Slovene Partisan hero Slavko Šlander.

Geography of Celje
Districts of the City Municipality of Celje